Skredbotnen Cirque is a cirque in Antarctica, indenting the west side of Mount Grytoyr in the Muhlig-Hofmann Mountains of Queen Maud Land. It was mapped from surveys and air photos by the Sixth Norwegian Antarctic Expedition (1956–60) and named Skredbotnen (the avalanche cirque).

Cirques of Queen Maud Land
Princess Martha Coast